Jann Turner (born 1964) is a South African film director, novelist, television director and screenwriter. Her feature film directorial debut was the 2009 film White Wedding.

Life and career
Turner was born to anti-Apartheid academic Rick Turner and later politician Barbara Hubbard. Her father was killed in front of her when she was thirteen years old; her parents were divorced at that time. Turner along with her younger sister, Kim, spent most of her childhood living in Cape Town, with their mother. Three months after her father's murder, the family fled to Britain due to threats of being banned. Turner completed her education in Britain and the United States, graduating from Oxford University and Tisch School of the Arts.

Prior to film directing, Turner worked as an editor for television specials at National Geographic Society, and directed and produced episodic television shows in South Africa. Turner then moved to Los Angeles, where she now lives with her two children, and directed episodes of The Big C, Emily Owens, M.D., The Carrie Diaries and 9-1-1.

Turner is also a novelist and has authored the novels Heartland, Southern Cross and Home Is Where You Find It. She has also written for the teen drama Teen Wolf.

References

External links

1964 births
Living people
Writers from Cape Town
Writers from Los Angeles
Alumni of the University of Oxford
Women television directors
South African emigrants to the United States
South African film directors
South African screenwriters
South African women novelists
Tisch School of the Arts alumni
White South African people
American women screenwriters
Date of birth missing (living people)
Place of birth missing (living people)
Screenwriters from California